Oleg Maisenberg (born 29 April 1945) is a Soviet-Austrian pianist and teacher.

Early life and career
Born  to a Jewish family in Odessa, Oleg Maisenberg received his first piano lessons from his mother at the age of five. He completed his studies at the Central Music School Kishinev and at the Gnessin Institute in Moscow with Professor Alexander Jocheles. In 1967 he won the second prize at the "International Schubert Competition" in Vienna, where in the same year he won the first prize in the competition "Music of the 20th Century". From 1971 to 1980 he appeared regularly with the Moscow Philharmonic Orchestra and other renowned orchestras of the former Soviet Union.

Move to Vienna and international career
In 1981 Oleg Maisenberg emigrated to Vienna.  Since then he has appeared with the Israel Philharmonic, the Philadelphia Orchestra, the London Symphony Orchestra, the Vienna Symphony Orchestra, the Berlin Philharmonic, with the conductors Christoph von Dohnányi, Zubin Mehta, Eugene Ormandy, Herbert Blomstedt, Stanisław Skrowaczewski, Neeme Järvi, Rafael Frühbeck de Burgos, Georges Prêtre, Alain Lombard, Michel Plasson, Nikolaus Harnoncourt, Vladimir Fedosejev, and Esa-Pekka Salonen.

Maisenberg frequently appears with chamber orchestras such as the Orpheus Chamber Orchestra New York, the Chamber Orchestra of Europe, the Deutsche Kammerphilharmonie Bremen, the Wiener Virtuosen (members of the Vienna Philharmonic), and the Lithuanian Chamber Orchestra.

He has devoted much of his time to chamber music, collaborating with such artists as Hermann Prey, Robert Holl, Heinz Holliger, Sabine Meyer, András Schiff, Renaud and Gautier Capuçon. His continuing collaboration with the violinist Gidon Kremer commenced during his early years in Russia.

Maisenberg has appeared at most of the major festival venues in Salzburg, Vienna, Lockenhaus, Lucerne, Berlin, Florence, Edinburgh, Piano Festival Ruhr and Sviatoslav Richter Festival in Moscow, among others, and has performed as a recitalist throughout the world.  His repertoire encompasses all stylistic epochs - his particular preference being the music of the 19th century.

Recordings
Maisenberg has participated in numerous recordings and TV productions including LPs and CDs with compositions by Schubert, Schumann, Liszt, Rachmaninov, Scriabin, Stravinsky, Berg, Webern, Schönberg, and Darius Milhaud have appeared under the Orfeo, Harmonia Mundi, Teldec and Deutsche Grammophon labels, and recordings in the field of chamber music have been released by ECM, Preiser Records and the Philips labels.

One unique event in Maisenberg's career was his 12 concert recital series at the Wiener Konzerthaus in the 1994/95 season in which each concert was dedicated to a different composer. A commemorative edition of five CDs, which include selections of these live performances, was issued by the Wiener Konzerthaus and more recently on the Glissando label.

Teaching and adjudication
Between 1985 and 1998, Oleg Maisenberg was Professor of Piano at the Musikhochschule in Stuttgart. As of 2008 he is listed as a Professor in the Institute of Keyboard Instruments (Tasteninstrumente) at the University of Music and Performing Arts, Vienna. Former students include Till Fellner, Moto Harada, Hyung-ki Joo and Khatia Buniatishvili

Honours
In April 1995 Oleg Maisenberg was awarded the title of "Honorary Member" of the Wiener Konzerthaus Society.

Federal Chancellor Wolfgang Schüssel awarded the Austrian Cross of Honour for Science and Art to Oleg Maisenberg in 2005.

References

1945 births
Living people
Austrian classical pianists
Male classical pianists
Gnessin State Musical College alumni
Musicians from Odesa
Soviet classical pianists
20th-century classical pianists
Jewish classical pianists
21st-century classical pianists
20th-century male musicians
21st-century male musicians
Jewish Ukrainian musicians
Odesa Jews
Ukrainian classical pianists